The 1933 Central State Bearcats football team represented Central State Teachers College, later renamed Central Michigan University, as an independent during the 1933 college football season. In their third and final season under head coach George Van Bibber, the Bearcats compiled a 5–2–1 record, shut out four of eight opponents, and outscored all opponents by a combined total of 164 to 58. The team lost to its in-state rivals Michigan State Normal (7–13) and Western State Teachers (0–19).

In April 1934, Van Bibber resigned as the head football coach at Central State, instead accepting a position as the head football coach and director of physical education at the University of Buffalo. Van Bibber had been a guard at Purdue, graduating in 1932. In three seasons at Central State, Van Bibber compiled a 12–9–2 record.

Schedule

References

Central State
Central Michigan Chippewas football seasons
Central State Bearcats football